Inttelligent is a 2018 Indian Telugu-language action film directed by V. V. Vinayak, featuring Sai Dharam Tej and Lavanya Tripathi in the lead role along with Rahul Dev, Dev Gill, Nassar, Ashish Vidyarthi, Sayaji Shinde, Brahmanandam, Jaya Prakash Reddy, Vineet Kumar and Saptagiri in key roles. The music was composed by Thaman. The film follows a software engineer who becomes a vigilante after the murder of his mentor and tries to protect his company from the killers.

Based on real-life incidents that took place at Kukatpally in 2014, the film was released on 9 February 2018. Following the negative critical reception, the film became a commercial failure.

Plot
Dharam Tej (Sai Dharam Tej) is an associate software engineer who is very loyal to his company and its MD, Nandha Kishore (Nassar). As time passes by, a criminal gang lands in Hyderabad and tries to overtake the company. In this process, Nandha Kishore gets killed and to make things better, Dharma Teja kills the villain's brother and injures his henchmen brutally and takes on a new identity of Dharma Bhai. Being an ethical hacker he tracks all the politicians and Vicky bhai's henchmen who is behind Nandakishore's death. Finally in the end he thefts all black money of politicians and gives to poor people and kills the mafia and marries his long time girlfriend Shreya who is Nandakishore's Daughter.

Cast

 Sai Dharam Tej as Dharma Teja/Dharma Bhai
 Lavanya Tripathi as Shreya
 Ashish Vidyarthi as Venkateshwar Rao I.P.S 
 Sayaji Shinde as Mohanty I.P.S (Commissioner) 
 Rahul Dev as Vicky Bhai
 Nassar as Nandha Kishore
 Brahmanandam as Dharma Raju 
 Dev Gill as Dhina
 Jaya Prakash Reddy as Sathya Murthy I.P.S 
 Vineet Kumar as Home Minister 
 Duvvasi Mohan as  Minister P.A
 Y. Kasi Viswanath as Dharma Teja's father
 Rahul Ramakrishna as Rahul,  Teja's friend
 Saptagiri as Giri (Teja's Friend)
 Venu as Dharma Teja's friend
 Venky as Dharma Teja's friend
 Vidyullekha Raman as Sathya Murthy's daughter
 Posani Krishna Murali as Yadav
 Raghu Babu as Politician
 Thagubothu Ramesh as a drunken guy (Cameo Appearance)
 Prudhvi Raj as M.L.A
 Fish Venkat as Yadav's Men
 Mahesh Achanta as M.L.A's Assistant

Soundtrack 

The music was composed by S. Thaman and released by Aditya Music.

Box office

The film was a disaster at the box office, collecting a share of 3.65 crore after being sold for Rs.27 crores worldwide and recovered only 13.5 percent of its investment. It received desperately negative reviews for its outdated story, direction; music; insane sequences; dialogues etc.

References

External links

 

2018 films
2010s Telugu-language films
2018 action films
Indian action films
Indian vigilante films
Indian films based on actual events
Action films based on actual events
Films directed by V. V. Vinayak
2010s vigilante films